Unfinished Portrait may refer to:

 Unfinished Portrait (novel), a semi-autobiographical novel written by Agatha Christie
 Unfinished portrait of Franklin D. Roosevelt, a watercolor of President Franklin Delano Roosevelt by Elizabeth Shoumatoff
 Unfinished portrait of General Bonaparte, an unfinished portrait of Napoleon Bonaparte by Jacques-Louis David